List of storms named Wendy
 Typhoon Wendy (1957)
 Typhoon Wendy (1960)
 Typhoon Wendy (1963)
 Tropical Storm Wendy (1965)
 Typhoon Wendy (1968)
 Cyclone Wendy (1971)
 Typhoon Wendy (1971)
 Tropical Cyclone Wendy (1972)
 Typhoon Wendy (1978)
 Tropical Storm Wendy (1999)